I Shall Exterminate Everything Around Me That Restricts Me from Being the Master is the fourth album by the Detroit rock band Electric Six.

Music videos were made for the tracks "Down at McDonnelzzz" and "Randy's Hot Tonight!".

Track listing
All lyrics written by Tyler Spencer, music composition noted below.

"It's Showtime!" (Shipps) – 1:53
"Down at McDonnelzzz" (Spencer/Shipps) – 4:01
"Dance Pattern" (Spencer/Shipps) – 3:41
"Rip It!" (Spencer/Shipps) – 3:37
"Feed My Fuckin' Habit" (Spencer/Shipps) – 2:11
"Riding on the White Train" (Spencer/Shipps) – 2:48
"Broken Machine" (Tait) – 3:16
"When I Get to the Green Building" (Spencer/Shipps) – 3:54
"Randy's Hot Tonight!" (Nash) – 3:04
"Kukuxumushu" (Spencer) – 3:51
"I Don't Like You" (Spencer) – 2:53
"Lucifer Airlines" (Nash) – 2:49
"Lenny Kravitz" (Spencer) – 3:06
"Fabulous People" (Spencer/Shipps) – 2:27
"Sexy Trash" (Nash/Shipps) – 2:08
"Dirty Looks" (Nash/Shipps) – 4:46

Personnel
 Dick Valentine - vocals
  - lead guitar
 The Colonel - rhythm guitar
 Tait Nucleus? - keyboards
 Smorgasbord - bass
 Percussion World - drums

Other information
 The title of the album comes from a 1921 drawing by George Grosz, which depicts "a grotesque portrayal of a gloating capitalist with a porcine nozzle and cigar smoldering".
 The album artwork is taken from a painting called The Long Arm of the Law by Detroit artist Ron Zakrin, who was also behind the artwork for the band's follow-up album Flashy.
 The song "Kukuxumushu" (or Kukuxumusu) is Basque for "Flea's Kiss". Kukuxumusu is also a Spanish clothing brand. Tyler Spencer wrote the song after seeing a Kukuxumusu clothing shop whilst on tour, and deciding that he liked the word and wanted to use it.
 The song "Down at McDonnelzzz" was originally written as an interlude for inclusion on Switzerland, continuing the tradition of interludes on Señor Smoke. It was shelved specifically to allow it to be expanded into a full song on this album. The original "demo" version of the song was subsequently released on Sexy Trash.

Charts

Legacy
 Demo versions of "Down at McDonnelzzz" and "I Don't Like You" were subsequently released on the band's first compilation album "Sexy Trash".
 The band performed "It's Showtime!", "Down at McDonnelzzz" and "When I Get to the Green Building" on their first live album "Absolute Pleasure".
 The band performed "Down at McDonnelzzz" and "Rip It!" in their live concert film "Absolute Treasure".
 "Exterminate Tour Intro", a remix of "It's Showtime!" that was played to introduce the band at their live shows from this era, was subsequently released on the band's second compilation album "Mimicry and Memories".
 A song, "I Don't Speak French", was written for inclusion on this album. A demo was recorded but it was left off of the finished product. Dick Valentine later recorded a solo version of the song for inclusion on his debut solo album "Destroy the Children", whilst the demo recorded for this album was released on "Mimicry and Memories".
 Dick Valentine recorded an acoustic version of "When I Get to the Green Building" for his solo album "Quiet Time".
 "Down at McDonnelzzz" was featured in the band's mockumentary feature film "Roulette Stars of Metro Detroit".
 The band performed "Dance Pattern" and "Randy's Hot Tonight!" on their second live album "You're Welcome!"
 The band performed a stripped-down version of "Down at McDonnelzzz" and "When I Get to the Green Building" on their third live album "Chill Out!".

References

External links 
electricsixlyrics.co.uk: More information and rumours about the album

2007 albums
Electric Six albums
Metropolis Records albums